Men of the Jungle is a 1932 book by Ion Idriess. It covered three years in the life of Idriess and his three companions as they worked in north-east Queensland.

Reception
The book was published in September 1932 and had to be republished almost immediately.

Idriess later claimed the book was his favourite because it reminded him of the most idyllic time of his life.

References

1932 non-fiction books
Books by Ion Idriess
Australian autobiographies
Angus & Robertson books